Buadiposo-Buntong, officially the Municipality of Buadiposo-Buntong (Maranao and Iranun: Inged a Buadiposo-Buntong), is a 4th class municipality in the province of Lanao del Sur, Philippines. According to the 2020 census, it has a population of 18,046 people.

Geography

Barangays
Buadiposo-Buntong is politically subdivided into 33 barangays.

Climate

Demographics

Economy 

წ

References

External links
Buadiposo-Buntong Profile at the DTI Cities and Municipalities Competitive Index
[ Philippine Standard Geographic Code]
Philippine Census Information
Local Governance Performance Management System

Municipalities of Lanao del Sur
Populated places on Lake Lanao